Andre Davy Soma (born 12 August 1983) is a former Zimbabwean cricketer. A right-handed batsman and right-arm medium pace bowler, he played 13 first-class matches for Manicaland in the Logan Cup between 2000–01 and 2004–05. He also played one match for Easterns during the 2006–07 Logan Cup.

Soma was born in Mutare, Manicaland. He is the younger brother of cricketer Leon Soma.

References

External links
 
 

1983 births
Living people
Cricketers from Mutare
Zimbabwean cricketers
Manicaland cricketers
Easterns (Zimbabwe) cricketers